Ehrhardt Henry "Ott" Heller (June 2, 1910 – June 15, 1980) was a Canadian ice hockey defenceman who played in the National Hockey League with the New York Rangers between 1931 and 1946. He won the Stanley Cup twice with the Rangers, in 1933 and 1940. Originally a right wing, Heller learned to play as a defenseman early in his career.

Career
Heller started his National Hockey League career with the New York Rangers in 1931, signing with the team as a free agent on November 2, 1931. He would his entire career with the Rangers and retire after the 1946 season. In 1941, he was a member of the NHL All-Star team. He won the Stanley Cup twice, in 1933 and 1940. He served as Captain of the Rangers from 1942 to 1945.

Coaching
After leaving the Rangers in 1946, Heller had several head coaching stints in the minors, where he often had the dual role of player-coach. He led the Indianapolis Capitals to the Calder Cup as a player-coach during the 1949-50 AHL season, a team that had future Hockey Hall Of Fame goaltender Terry Sawchuk in net for 61 out of a possible 70 games.

Heller finished his career with the Chatham Sr. Maroons in 1956, scoring two assists in seven games.

Death
Heller died on June 15, 1980 in his hometown of Kitchener, less than two weeks after his 70th birthday.

Legacy
In the 2009 book 100 Ranger Greats, the authors ranked Heller at No. 25 all-time of the 901 New York Rangers who had played during the team's first 82 seasons.

Career statistics

Regular season and playoffs

Awards and accomplishments
1932–33, Stanley Cup champion (New York Rangers)
1936–37, Most Penalty Minutes (New York Rangers - tie with Joe Cooper)
1938–39, Most Assists (New York Rangers)
1939–40, Stanley Cup champion (New York Rangers)
1940–41, NHL second All-Star team
1942–45, Team Captain (New York Rangers)
1946–47, AHL second All-Star team
1947–48, AHL first All-Star team
1949–50, Calder Cup champion (Indianapolis Capitals)
1953–54, IHL second All-Star team

References

External links
 
 Picture of Ehrhardt Heller's Name on the 1940 Stanley Cup Plaque

1910 births
1980 deaths
Canadian ice hockey defencemen
Cleveland Barons (1937–1973) players
Ice hockey people from Ontario
Ice hockey player-coaches
Indianapolis Capitals players
Marion Barons players
New Haven Ramblers players
New York Rangers players
Ontario Hockey Association Senior A League (1890–1979) players
St. Paul Saints (USHL) players
Sportspeople from Kitchener, Ontario
Springfield Indians players
Stanley Cup champions
Valleyfield Braves players
20th-century Canadian people